The Hoboken Thourots were an American basketball team based in Hoboken, New Jersey that was a member of the American Basketball League.

After 4 winless games, the team moved to Camden to become the Camden Brewers on November 23, 1933.

Year-by-year

References

Hoboken, New Jersey
Basketball teams in New Jersey
Sports in Hudson County, New Jersey
1933 establishments in New Jersey
1933 disestablishments in New Jersey
Basketball teams established in 1933
Sports clubs disestablished in 1933